Hanley is a former provincial electoral division for the Legislative Assembly of the province of Saskatchewan, Canada, centred on the town of Hanley, Saskatchewan. This district was created before the 2nd Saskatchewan general election in 1908. The riding was dissolved and combined with the Arm River, Rosthern, Kinistino, Saskatoon Buena Vista, Saskatoon Eastview, Saskatoon Sutherland and Biggar districts before the 18th Saskatchewan general election in 1975.

It is now part of the constituencies of Arm River-Watrous, Rosetown-Elrose, and Saskatoon Southeast.

Members of the Legislative Assembly

Election results

|-

 
|Provincial Rights
|Peder Myhre Henricks
|align="right"|658
|align="right"|48.31%
|align="right"|–
|- bgcolor="white"
!align="left" colspan=3|Total
!align="right"|1,362
!align="right"|100.00%
!align="right"|

|-

 
|Conservative
|John R. Hamilton
|align="right"|708
|align="right"|38.35%
|align="right"|-9.96
|- bgcolor="white"
!align="left" colspan=3|Total
!align="right"|1,846
!align="right"|100.00%
!align="right"|

|-

 
|Conservative
|Tobias Nelson Bjorndahl
|align="right"|689
|align="right"|38.86%
|align="right"|+0.51
|- bgcolor="white"
!align="left" colspan=3|Total
!align="right"|1,773
!align="right"|100.00%
!align="right"|

|-

|- bgcolor="white"
!align="left" colspan=3|Total
!align="right"|Acclamation
!align="right"|

|-

 
|Independent
|Paul G. Henricks
|align="right"|895
|align="right"|31.43%
|align="right"|–
|- bgcolor="white"
!align="left" colspan=3|Total
!align="right"|2,848
!align="right"|100.00%
!align="right"|

|-

|- bgcolor="white"
!align="left" colspan=3|Total
!align="right"|3,347
!align="right"|100.00%
!align="right"|

|-

|- bgcolor="white"
!align="left" colspan=3|Total
!align="right"|4,806
!align="right"|100.00%
!align="right"|

|-

 
|Conservative
|John Thomas McOrmond
|align="right"|1,703
|align="right"|28.62%
|align="right"|-

|Farmer-Labour
|Arthur John Fahl
|align="right"|1,405
|align="right"|23.61%
|align="right"|–
|- bgcolor="white"
!align="left" colspan=3|Total
!align="right"|5,951
!align="right"|100.00%
!align="right"|

|-

 
|Conservative
|John A. Stewart
|align="right"|1,623
|align="right"|27.07%
|align="right"|-1.55

|- bgcolor="white"
!align="left" colspan=3|Total
!align="right"|5,996
!align="right"|100.00%
!align="right"|

|-
 
|style="width: 130px"|CCF
|Jim Aitken
|align="right"|2,272
|align="right"|45.99%
|align="right"|-

 
|Prog. Conservative
|James H. Cannon
|align="right"|893
|align="right"|18.08%
|align="right"|-8.99
|- bgcolor="white"
!align="left" colspan=3|Total
!align="right"|4,940
!align="right"|100.00%
!align="right"|

|-
 
|style="width: 130px"|CCF
|Robert Walker
|align="right"|2,417
|align="right"|38.24%
|align="right"|-7.75

 
|Prog. Conservative
|Emmett M. Hall
|align="right"|1,025
|align="right"|16.22%
|align="right"|-1.86

|- bgcolor="white"
!align="left" colspan=3|Total
!align="right"|6,320
!align="right"|100.00%
!align="right"|

|-
 
|style="width: 130px"|CCF
|Robert Walker
|align="right"|2,977
|align="right"|50.78%
|align="right"|+12.54

 
|Prog. Conservative
|Martin P. Pederson
|align="right"|455
|align="right"|7.76%
|align="right"|-8.46
|- bgcolor="white"
!align="left" colspan=3|Total
!align="right"|5,863
!align="right"|100.00%
!align="right"|

|-
 
|style="width: 130px"|CCF
|Robert Walker
|align="right"|2,957
|align="right"|45.63%
|align="right"|-5.15

 
|Prog. Conservative
|Alfred V. "Al" Svoboda
|align="right"|256
|align="right"|3.95%
|align="right"|-3.81
|- bgcolor="white"
!align="left" colspan=3|Total
!align="right"|6,480
!align="right"|100.00%
!align="right"|

|-
 
|style="width: 130px"|CCF
|Robert Walker
|align="right"|3,348
|align="right"|44.36%
|align="right"|-1.27

 
|Prog. Conservative
|Roxwell Sekulich
|align="right"|1,059
|align="right"|14.03%
|align="right"|+10.08

|- bgcolor="white"
!align="left" colspan=3|Total
!align="right"|7,548
!align="right"|100.00%
!align="right"|

|-
 
|style="width: 130px"|CCF
|Robert Walker
|align="right"|3,940
|align="right"|37.59%
|align="right"|-6.77

 
|Prog. Conservative
|Hans Taal
|align="right"|2,602
|align="right"|24.83%
|align="right"|+10.80
|- bgcolor="white"
!align="left" colspan=3|Total
!align="right"|10,480
!align="right"|100.00%
!align="right"|

Re-run of voided election

|-
 
|style="width: 130px"|CCF
|Robert Walker
|align="right"|4,608
|align="right"|45.14%
|align="right"|+7.55

 
|Prog. Conservative
|W. Hugh Arscott
|align="right"|1,735
|align="right"|17.00%
|align="right"|-7.83
|- bgcolor="white"
!align="left" colspan=3|Total
!align="right"|10,207
!align="right"|100.00%
!align="right"|

|-

 
|NDP
|Robert Walker
|align="right"|2,149
|align="right"|48.50%
|align="right"|+3.36
|- bgcolor="white"
!align="left" colspan=3|Total
!align="right"|4,431
!align="right"|100.00%
!align="right"|

|-
 
|style="width: 130px"|NDP
|Paul Mostoway
|align="right"|3,270
|align="right"|55.07%
|align="right"|+6.57

|- bgcolor="white"
!align="left" colspan=3|Total
!align="right"|5,938
!align="right"|100.00%
!align="right"|

See also
Electoral district (Canada)
List of Saskatchewan provincial electoral districts
List of Saskatchewan general elections
List of political parties in Saskatchewan

References
 

Former provincial electoral districts of Saskatchewan